RIM-85 was a short-lived project by the United States Navy to develop a surface-to-air missile for the defense of naval vessels. Developed during the late 1960s, the project was cancelled before the start of detailed design work.

Development and cancellation
During the 1960s, the United States Navy identified a requirement for a new type of surface-to-air missile, capable of defending ships against attack by enemy aircraft and missiles. The resulting specification called for a medium-range missile, capable of being used in all weather conditions; in addition to its air defense role, the missile was intended to possess a secondary capability in the surface-to-surface mission for use against enemy ships.

In July 1968, the project was assigned the Mission Designation System designation ZRIM-85A, the "Z" indicating a project in the planning stage; however, the program was cancelled later that year, before any significant design work on the missile, or any development of hardware, had been conducted.

References
Notes

Bibliography

External links
 

Naval surface-to-air missiles of the United States
Abandoned military rocket and missile projects of the United States